Web 3.0 may refer to:

 Semantic Web, often called Web 3.0
 Web3 (also confusingly sometimes referred to as Web 3.0) is a general idea for a decentralized Internet based on public blockchains
 Web3 Foundation, founded by Gavin Wood, an English computer scientist and co-founder of Ethereum